Albert H. Kelley (October 7, 1894 May 2, 1989) was an American film director. He is often credited as Albert Kelly or Albert Kelley.

After previously working as an assistant director, Kelley directed a large number of short and feature films between 1921 and 1953 generally for low-budget companies. His most ambitious films was the American–Argentine silent historical film The Charge of the Gauchos (1928).

Selected filmography
 Home Stuff (1921)
 His New York Wife (1926)
 Shameful Behavior? (1926)
 Dancing Days (1926)
 Stage Kisses (1927)
 Confessions of a Wife (1928)
 The Charge of the Gauchos (1928)
 Campus Knights (1929)
 The Woman Racket (1930)
 Jungle Bride (1933)
 Double Cross (1941)
 Submarine Base (1943)
 Street Corner (1948)

See also

 List of film and television directors
 List of people from Connecticut
 List of people from California

References

Bibliography 
 Finkielman, Jorge (2003). The Film Industry in Argentina: An Illustrated Cultural History.  Jefferson, North Carolina; London: McFarland & Company.  .

External links 
 

1894 births
1989 deaths
Film directors from California
People from Wallingford, Connecticut
People from Los Angeles County, California
Silent film directors
Film directors from Connecticut